I'm a UFO in This City is the second studio album by British rock band LostAlone, released on 5 March 2012 in the United Kingdom and on 4 March 2012 as a digital release.

Release and promotion
LostAlone announced the name of a new track, "Paradox on Earth", from their forthcoming album on 13 February 2011 and offered it as a free download. The album was officially announced in 2011 with the title "I'm a UFO in This City". The first single was announced on 15 September 2011, entitled "Do You Get What You Pray For?" with release on 5 February 2012. I'm a UFO in This City was first previewed to a select few fans at a Christmas homeshow at The Victoria Inn, Derby on 22 December 2011 before LostAlone played their final show of 2011.  The second single entitled "Love Will Eat You Alive" had its video premiered on NME on 27 February 2012 and was released on 1 April 2012.

Track listing
 All music by Steven Battelle. "Obey the Rules", "Love Will Eat You Alive" and "Paradox on Earth" produced by Jacknife Lee, all other tracks produced by Greg Wells.

Personnel
LostAlone
 Steven Battelle — lead vocals, piano, lyrics, guitar
 Alan Williamson  — bass, backing vocals
 Mark Gibson — drums, percussion, backing vocals
Production personnel
 Jacknife Lee - producer
 Greg Wells - producer
 Gerard Way - executive producer
 Alan Moulder - engineer
 Mark Needham - engineer

References

2012 albums
LostAlone albums